Fazzari is a south italian surname of Arabic origin. Notable people with the surname include:

Carlo Fazzari (born 1990), Italian rugby union player 
Michelle Fazzari (born 1987), Canadian wrestler

References

Surnames of Italian origin
Surnames of Arabic origin